Kunhardtia is a group of plants in the family Rapateaceae described as a genus in 1958.

The genus is endemic to the State of Amazonas  in southern Venezuela.

 Species
 Kunhardtia radiata Maguire & Steyerm.
 Kunhardtia rhodantha Maguire

References

Poales genera
Rapateaceae
Endemic flora of Venezuela